Daisy Lan Hung (born March 29, 1947) is a Taiwanese psychologist. She is the founding director of the Institute of Neuroscience at the National Central University in Taiwan. Her research areas are involved with cognitive psychology, psycholinguistics, neuropsychology and neurolinguistics. In addition to conducting research, Hung also translates scientific works, educates children on reading habits and lectures on her research topics.

Personal life and education 
Born on May 29, 1947, Hung studied law at the National Taiwan University from 1965-1969 before pursuing a master's degree in Experimental Psychology with a minor in Statistics at the University of California at Riverside from 1978-1979. She continued her studies at the University of California, Riverside, and was awarded a PhD in Cognitive Psychology along with a minor in Neurolinguistics in 1980. Hung is married to Ovid Tzeng, a linguistics professor at the Linguistics Institute at Academia Sinica .

Career and research 
After receiving her doctorate, Hung remained in the United States for another eleven years before returning to Taiwan. From 1980 to 1981, Hung was a postdoctoral research associate at The Haskins Laboratory (New Haven, CT). Following this role, Hung continued her research as a Postdoctoral Fellow with the National Science Foundation at University of California, Irvine Medical School from 1981 to 1982. After her fellowship with the National Science Foundation, Hung was a postdoctoral research associate at University of California, Riverside from 1982 to 1984 and at  Salk Institute for Biological Studies from 1985 to 1986. Hung spent 1984 to 1985 as a visiting associate professor at National Taiwan University. Continuing her work at the Salk Institute for Biological Studies, Hung was named a Wang Institute Fellow from 1986 to 1987 before also serving as a visiting research assistant from 1987 to 1989. Hung ended her time in the United States as a research associate professor at University of California, Riverside from 1989 to 1991. 

Hung returned to Taiwan in 1991 and served as a psychology professor at National Chung Cheng University from 1991 to 1997 and at the Institute of Neuroscience College at National Yang Ming University from 1997 to 2008. In 2008, Hung was the Founding Director of Laboratories for Cognitive Neuroscience at National Yang-Ming University in Taiwan. Since 2008, Hung has continued to serve as the director as well as become the research lead of the Emotion and Criminology Lab at the Institute of Cognitive Neuroscience, located in the College of Science at the National Central University in Taiwan. In 2015, Hung was also named the Siu Lien Wong Visiting Fellow of the Chung Chi College and the Chinese University of Hong Kong, which is awarded to one outstanding academic scholar. As the Siu Lien Wong Visiting Fellow, Hung provided public lectures at the college and spoke at the College's Annual Education Conference. Recently, on October 15th, 2019, Hung and her spouse, Tzeng worked with the Haskins Laboratory, where Hung worked as a postdoctoral research associate in the early years of her career, to officially found a joint developmental neuroscience lab at the National Taiwan Normal University studying the relationship between language and the brain along with clinical studies of language and reading disorders.

Academic impact 
While she has translated over 50 books on biotech & psychology to popularize scientific knowledge, Hung has also visited about 1000 primary & secondary schools to promote reading habits. In addition to promoting greater access to scientific knowledge aside from her work in translation and education, Hung has also spoke at a numerous talks and lectures discussing her work.

"Neuroscience Reveals the Secret of A Women's Thinking" TEDxTaipeiWomen - Momentum Talk (2015) 
On May 30, 2015, Hung was invited by the Taipei chapter of the TED conference to talk about her research on differences between men and women regarding emotions and expressions of communication that can be traced back to gender differences in brain structure and function. When language is spoken, Hung's research indicates that the thicker corpus callosum found in women, compared to men, corresponds to activation of both the left and right hemispheres of the brain; whereas, only the left hemisphere is activated in men. Since the brain's left hemisphere predominantly processes language and its right hemisphere predominantly processes emotion, Hung makes the connection in that women tend to use emotion more in language. In addition to this conclusion on structural differences in regions of activation, Hung also discussed her work on measuring the different levels of serotonin production between men and women. From Hung's findings, men can also produce serotonin faster than women, suggesting a possible explanation for differences in time needed for conflict resolution between genders. On a broader scale, Hung explains that her research fits into the evolutionary psychological perspective of gender differences where women provide more attention to details and store more information in their subconscious, compared to men. Hung refers to this characteristic as the "Sixth Sense" of women. The youtube video of Hung's TED talk has over 2 millions views since its publication on June 25th, 2015.

References

External links
 Semantic Scholar

Living people
1947 births
Scientists from Taipei
Taiwanese women scientists
Taiwanese psychologists
Taiwanese women psychologists
Taiwanese neuroscientists
University of California, Riverside alumni
National Taiwan University alumni
Academic staff of the National Central University
Spouses of Taiwanese politicians